Perfect Drift, (foaled April 29, 1999, in Kentucky) is an American thoroughbred racehorse.

Background
Perfect Drift is a bay gelding sired by the leading stallion Dynaformer, out of the Naskra mare Nice Gal. Perfect Drift was owned by Stonecrest Farm and bred by Kansas City heart surgeon Dr. William A. Reed (owner of Stonecrest).  He was trained by Murray Johnson.  Johnson is an Australian, born and bred, but long ago relocated to Kentucky following his trade.  He trained Perfect Drift throughout almost his entire career at his own  Trackside Stable in Louisville, Kentucky. Perfect Drift started 50 times. The gelding has won 11 of those starts, placed in 13, and came in third six times, finishing in the money in approximately 75 percent of those starts.

Perfect Drift won on both dirt and turf, at distances ranging from 6½ furlongs to 1 and a quarter miles.  He raced on at least 12 different tracks, and recorded Beyer Speed Figures of 100 or more on many occasions.

Racing career

As a three-year-old in 2002, he won the Grade II Spiral Stakes, the Grade III Indiana Derby (by 2006, this became a Grade II event), the Turfway Prevue Stakes, and came home second in the WEBN Frog Stakes, the John Battaglia Memorial Stakes, and ran third in the Kentucky Derby. That was the year War Emblem won the Derby and the Preakness. Perfect Drift's Derby was marred by being checked by War Emblem and forced to alter course to the outside. This allowed Proud Citizen to take second, but Perfect Drift still took third, ahead of Medaglia d'Oro, Harlan's Holiday, Essence of Dubai, and Saarland.

In 2003, with War Emblem already retired for lucrative stallion duties in Japan, four-year-old Perfect Drift won the Grade I Stephen Foster Handicap, the Grade II Washington Park Handicap, the Grade II Kentucky Cup Classic Handicap, and the Grade II Hawthorne Gold Cup Handicap.

When he was five, he placed in the Grade I Whitney Handicap, the Pacific Classic Stakes, his second Hawthorne Gold Cup, the Grade III Cornhusker Breeders' Cup Handicap, the Grade III Alysheba Stakes, and was third in the Clark Handicap and his second Stephen Foster.

At six, he took the Washington Park Handicap for the second time (setting a new record), was again second in the Grade I Pacific Classic Stakes, and second in his third Stephen Foster, second in the Grade I Breeders' Cup Classic, and second in his second Clark Handicap. 
 
At seven, he had run in his fourth Stephen Foster, placing, his third Washington Park Handicap, again placing, and his second Kentucky Cup Classic, also placing. In this last race, up against the five-year-old Lava Man, Perfect Drift finished second.

He has run in five straight Breeders' Cup Classics, finishing third in 2005, and fourth in 2004. In 2006, he was unplaced. On November 7, 2006, Murray Johnson announced that he believed a breathing problem hindered Perfect Drift's run in the Classic.  A post-race examination showed he suffered from chondritis, which limits air intake. "He couldn't get his air, basically," said Johnson. "It's caused from a virus. They breathe all right for a while and it doesn't affect the functions of the throat. But when they become tired, they just can't get the air."

For two years, Perfect Drift went back into the Clark Handicap after the Classic, but in 2006 Johnson skipped that race. "I think we'll just make sure his throat's all right."  In some press reports, the condition is being called Costochondritis. In any case it is an inflammation of the cartilage that attaches the front of the ribs to the breastbone.

At the age of seven, the gelding earned $370,293 over the course of 2006. Johnson called it "...a great year, a lot of fun, although it wasn't our best year. I don't see any reason why we won't be back next year to try it again."

Perfect Drift has been ridden by a dozen or so jockeys, including Hall of Famers Eddie Delahoussaye, Pat Day and Gary Stevens, all now retired.  Day was up for his big wins, guiding Perfect Drift to four graded victories in 2003: the Stephen Foster Handicap, the Washington Park Handicap, the Kentucky Cup Classic, and the Hawthorne Gold Cup. In 2007, Jon Court was in the saddle for the $250,000 Grade II Californian Stakes at Hollywood Park.

Perfect Drift ran in 19 Grade I races.  In 2006, he took another shot at the Breeder's Cup Classic under  leading jockey Garrett Gomez (who rode two Breeders' Cup World Championship winners in 2005). He tied Sprint winner Kona Gold as the only horse to make five starts in a Breeders' Cup event and was the first horse to start that many times in the Classic.

In July, 2007, it was reported that Perfect Drift had a small fracture in his cannon bone, possibly career threatening, and that he would be turned out for several months before being re-evaluated. The injury was believed to have occurred on May 4 during the Alysheba Stakes on a sloppy track at Churchill Downs, when Perfect Drift placed fourth behind Wanderin Boy.  He underwent surgery to repair this injury (the insertion of a screw) in the fall of 2007 and was then placed in the care of trainer Richard Mandella. In late March 2008, it was announced that Perfect Drift was back in training.

Retirement

In September 2008, Mandella announced Perfect Drift's retirement.  Asked by Dr. Reed, "...if could bring Perfect Drift back off a layoff, I said sure.  The only stipulation was that he wanted the horse to enjoy himself and stay sound and compete at a fairly high level. Anytime we thought it wasn't going in the right way we would stop with him.  We had some good races with him, but he never reached the level I thought he should have been at.  But he's in great shape; very healthy and very sound."

On September 27, 2008 (Kentucky Cup day), Perfect Drift was honored at Turfway Park.

He went home to live out his life at Stonecrest Farms in Kansas City, Missouri, home of his breeder, but spent a summer at the Kentucky Derby Museum  at Churchill Downs. Since then, Perfect Drift has come back to the track at Churchill Downs as a pony horse. Notably he was California Chrome's pony in the 2014 Kentucky Derby as well as for Firing Line in the 2015 Kentucky Derby.

Perfect Drift won $4,714,213.  This makes him the seventh richest gelding by lifetime earnings in North America, behind Wise Dan, John Henry, Game on Dude, Best Pal, Lava Man, and Well Armed.

References
 Perfect Drift's pedigree
 Perfect Drift's 2003 Stephen Foster Handicap
 A page of photos
 Tribute to Perfect Drift on YouTube
 NTRA bio
 Perfect Drift's Classic Pedigree Profile

External links
 NTRA Injury Could End Perfect Drift Career

1999 racehorse births
Thoroughbred family 12-b
Racehorses trained in the United States
Racehorses bred in Kentucky